Bhavna Jayanty Limbachia (born 21 April 1984) is a British actress. She is known for her roles as Alia Khan in Citizen Khan and Rana Habeeb in Coronation Street.

Career

Limbachia studied photography, fashion and textiles at college, then moved onto a degree course in Costume Design at Bretton Hall, an affiliate college of the University of Leeds.

Before her acting roles, she worked in the costume departments on several film sets including Chicken Tikka Masala in (2005), Bradford Riots in 2006 (costume trainee) and All Day Breakfast in 2008. In 2010 she set up her own business designing and selling vintage clothing and accessories.

She took an office with Trading Standards and saved up money to do an acting course at the Manchester School of Acting, landing her first role in theatre in the play Rafta Rafta, written by Ayub Khan Din who also wrote East Is East.

Her first television role was in 2012 playing the character Alia Khan in the BBC comedy series Citizen Khan. The character wears a hijab, tight jeans and tops, and a lot of make-up.

Coronation Street
In February 2016, Limbachia joined the long-running ITV soap opera, Coronation Street, playing Rana Habeeb as a love interest for character Zeedan Nazir. In January 2019, Limbachia announced her departure from the show, with Rana being killed off later in the year. She departed in the episode broadcast on 20 March 2019.

Rana was the show's first muslim lesbian character and her partnership with Faye Brookes, who plays her lover Kate Connor has been highlighted amongst fans and the community. The storyline in which Rana discovers her sexuality and her parents’ subsequent disappointment was praised and the two characters gained the supercouple name ‘Kana’. The Rana and Kate storyline was named as one of the Top 10 LGBT+ Media Moments in the British LGBT Awards 2019.

Personal life
She was born in the UK in 1984. Her mother was born in India and her father was born in Kenya. She is a Hindu.

She married actor Darren Kuppan in July 2018 at Thornton Manor in a British and Indian ceremony.

Filmography

Awards and nominations

References

External links

Bhavna Limbachia Website

1984 births
Living people
Actors from Preston, Lancashire
Actresses from Lancashire
English people of Gujarati descent
English people of Kenyan descent
English Hindus
English soap opera actresses
21st-century British actresses